The 2011 Cricket Canada Summer Festival was a cricket tournament in Canada, taking place between 11–13 August 2011. Four teams participated (Afghanistan, Canada, Trinidad and Tobago, and the USA) in a round robin tournament.

Teams
There were 4 teams that played in the tournament.

Squads

Group stage

Points table

Results

Cricket Summer Festival
Summer Festival 2011
Canada Summer Festival
Cricket Canada